Misti, also known as Putina or Guagua Putina, is a stratovolcano of andesite, dacite, and rhyolite located in southern Peru near the city of Arequipa.

Description
Misti has three concentric craters. Active fumaroles (volcanic gas vents) can be seen in the inner crater. Near the inner crater, six Inca mummies and rare Inca artifacts were found in 1998 during a month-long excavation directed by archaeologists Johan Reinhard and Jose Antonio Chavez. These findings are currently stored at the Museo de Santuarios Andinos in Arequipa.

The volcano has two main climbing routes. Neither climbing route presents technical difficulties, but both are considered strenuous because of the steep loose sand slopes.

Surrounding area
A long history of eruptions from Misti and its neighboring volcanoes has caused the local soil to be extremely fertile, making the surrounding area one of the most agriculturally productive in Peru. Locals also make extensive use of a white volcanic rock called sillar, which is strong but easily workable. The city of Arequipa has a significant number of buildings constructed with sillar, resulting in the nickname la ciudad blanca ("the white city").

Gallery

See also

List of volcanoes in Peru

References

Bibliography

External links 
 
 

Stratovolcanoes of Peru
Mountains of Arequipa Region
Andean Volcanic Belt
Subduction volcanoes
Mountains of Peru
Holocene stratovolcanoes
Quaternary South America
Five-thousanders of the Andes